Jack Conley (18 October 1920 – 7 July 2008) was an Australian rules footballer in the Victorian Football League (VFL).

External links

References

  at Blueseum

1920 births
2008 deaths
Australian rules footballers from Victoria (Australia)
Carlton Football Club players
Carlton Football Club Premiership players
Coburg Football Club players
One-time VFL/AFL Premiership players